"Music to Watch Girls By" was the first Top 40 hit by Bob Crewe using his own name, recorded by his group The Bob Crewe Generation. The music was composed by Sidney "Sid" Ramin.

Background
Crewe first heard the song performed in a jingle demo for a Diet Pepsi commercial, and according to Greg Adams, writing for All Music Guide, the song "exemplified the groovy state of instrumental music at that time." In Bob Crewe's version, a trumpet plays the whole verse, the first time around, sounding like Herb Alpert's Tijuana brass style. The second time the verse is played, a half step up in tone from G minor to A-flat minor, a tenor saxophone plays a jazzier version, accompanied by strings, surf-style guitar (reminiscent of 1960s spy films) and a harpsichord, that play a counter-melody. The trumpets finish up the refrain, and all of the parts are played, repeating the first part in the coda, before the fade.

Chart performance
The "big-band, horn driven" recording went to #15 on the pop chart and #2 on the Easy Listening chart.

Andy Williams version

A vocal recording from 1967 by Andy Williams, featuring lyrics written by Tony Velona, went to #34 in the United States. This version was later used in a Fiat advertisement in the UK in 1999, with the re-released single reaching the top ten in that country.

Certifications and sales

Other recordings
A version by Al Hirt reached #31 on the Adult Contemporary chart and #119 on the Billboard Hot 100 in 1967.

References

1966 singles
1967 singles
1966 songs
Columbia Records singles
Songs based on jingles
Song recordings produced by Bob Crewe
1966 instrumentals